Vishva is an alternative name for Vishnu, which refers to the world, the universe. Vishva may also refer to
Vishva Chathuranga (born 1998), Sri Lankan cricketer 
Vishva Wijeratne (born 1992), Sri Lankan cricketer 
Vishva Malla (died 1560), King of Bhaktapur, Nepal 
Thakur Vishva Narain Singh (1928–2009), Indian journalist and Braille editor 
Acharya Vishva Bandhu, Indian Vedic scholar, writer and educationist

Indian masculine given names
Sinhalese masculine given names